Tomocichla tuba is a species of cichlid found in fast-moving waters on the Atlantic slope of Central America in Nicaragua, Costa Rica and Panama.

References 

Heroini
Fish described in 1912
Fish of Nicaragua
Taxa named by Seth Eugene Meek